Beverly Jo Morrow (born November 1, 1939) is an American actress who played the female lead in six B films between 1958 and 1964, and supporting roles in four major studio features, as well as appearing in 12 television episodes. Following a six-year absence, she returned to the screen in 1970, but after a few minor supporting roles, retired again in 1976.

Early years
Morrow was born in Cuero, Texas.  She won the 1958 Miss Pasadena (California) title and represented the city in that year's Miss California contest.

Career
Through a "Be a Star" contest, Morrow won a film contract with 20th Century Fox (with Gary Cooper in Ten North Frederick) in 1958. After only one film with 20th Century-Fox, she moved to Columbia Pictures, allegedly because a producer at 20th Century Fox tried to make a pass at her. At Columbia, she made some 10 films and a dozen TV series episodes between 1958 and 1963, the most notable being Our Man in Havana, in which she played Alec Guinness's daughter Milly. In 1962, Morrow appeared as Melanie Wells on the TV Western Lawman in the episode titled "The Bride".

Personal life
On June 30, 1963, Morrow married Jack Barnett, songwriter for Jimmy Durante. She gave up movies to look after her daughter Dawn who was born deaf in 1964. Son James followed two years later. She had a brief comeback in a few exploitation films and TV series episodes in the 1970s.

Filmography

References

External links
 
 
 

1939 births
Living people
American film actresses
People from Cuero, Texas
Western (genre) film actresses
20th-century American actresses
21st-century American women